Held Up for the Makin's is a 1920 American short silent Western film directed by B. Reeves Eason.

Cast
 Hoot Gibson 
 Mildred Moore
 George Field

See also
 Hoot Gibson filmography

External links
 

1920 films
1920 short films
1920 Western (genre) films
American silent short films
American black-and-white films
Films directed by B. Reeves Eason
Silent American Western (genre) films
Universal Pictures short films
1920s American films